John A. Hutchison (born 1950) is an American lawyer serving as a justice of the Supreme Court of Appeals of West Virginia. He joined the court in 2018 and served as chief justice in 2022.

Education

Hutchison received his Bachelor of Arts in history and political science from Davis & Elkins College in 1972. He graduated with his Juris Doctor from the West Virginia University College of Law in 1980.

Career

Hutchison practiced law in Raleigh County for 10 years with Gorman, Sheatsley and Hutchison. In 1991, he opened the Nationwide Insurance West Virginia Trial Division Office and served as its managing trial attorney for four years.

Judicial service

Hutchison was appointed to the bench in the Tenth Judicial Circuit (Raleigh County) by then-Governor Gaston Caperton in 1995, and he was elected to that seat in 1996 and re-elected in 2000, 2008 and 2016.

Supreme Court of Appeals of West Virginia 
After the resignation of Justice Allen Loughry, Hutchison was one of fifteen people interviewed by the West Virginia Judicial Vacancy Advisory Commission for the vacancy. He was appointed by Governor Jim Justice on December 12, 2018. Justice appointed Hutchison despite their different party registration. Hutchison had previously been elected as a Democrat through several partisan judicial elections. Nevertheless, the Republican Justice called Hutchison "one of the most conservative, respected jurists in the state of West Virginia" upon his appointment. Then-Republican Party Chair Melody Potter celebrated the appointment while Belinda Biafore, chairwoman of the state Democratic Party, accused Justice of playing politics with the appointment.

In June 2020, Hutchison faced his first election to serve the remainder of former Justice Allen Loughry's term. Hutchison beat Lora Dyer, a circuit court judge on the Fifth West Virginia Circuit Court
and attorney William Schwartz. Hutchison became chief justice in 2022.

Personal
He is married to Victoria Lagowski Hutchison and they have two children and two grandchildren.

References

External links
Official Biography on the West Virginia Judiciary website

|-

1950 births
21st-century American judges
Chief Justices of the Supreme Court of Appeals of West Virginia
Davis & Elkins College alumni
Living people
Lawyers from Beckley, West Virginia
West Virginia Democrats
West Virginia circuit court judges
West Virginia University College of Law alumni